The Călinești is a right tributary of the river Olt in Romania. It discharges into the Olt in the village Călinești.

Tributaries

The following rivers are tributaries to the river Călinești (from source to mouth):

Left: Murgașul Mare, Lupul, Lotriorul
Right: Izvorul Sașa, Aninoasa, Pârâul Sulițelor

References

Rivers of Romania
Rivers of Vâlcea County